William E. "Jocko" Halligan (December 8, 1868 in Avon, New York – February 13, 1945 in Buffalo, New York), was a professional baseball player who played outfielder in the Major Leagues from 1890–1892. He would play for the Baltimore Orioles, Cincinnati Reds, and Buffalo Bisons.

External links

1868 births
1945 deaths
Major League Baseball outfielders
Baltimore Orioles (NL) players
Buffalo Bisons (PL) players
Cincinnati Reds players
19th-century baseball players
Binghamton Crickets (1880s) players
Canandaigua (minor league baseball) players
Buffalo Bisons (minor league) players
Omaha Lambs players
Wilkes-Barre Coal Barons players
Kansas City Blues (baseball) players
Jersey City Skeeters players
Scranton Miners players
Baseball players from New York (state)
People from Avon, New York
Burials in Buffalo, New York